Dave Elliott (born 10 February 1945) is an English former professional footballer and manager.

A midfielder, he began his career as an apprentice at Sunderland before moving to Newcastle United and Southend United. In 1975, he joined Newport County as player/manager and made 21 Football League appearances in the 1975–76 season before joining Bangor City as player/manager. He rejoined Newport during the 1978–79 season, making a further two appearances before becoming player/manager of Caernarfon Town.

His daughter, Louise Elliott, is a TV and radio presenter for BBC Wales.

After retirement, he opened a shop in Bangor, Gwynedd which remained well into the 1990s called'Dave Elliott Sports' which was very successful until the arrival of Allsports (which later became JJB Sports).

References

 

Living people
1945 births
People from Tantobie
Footballers from County Durham
English footballers
Association football midfielders
Sunderland A.F.C. players
Newcastle United F.C. players
Southend United F.C. players
Newport County A.F.C. players
Bangor City F.C. players
Caernarfon Town F.C. players
English Football League players
Northern Premier League players
English football managers
Newport County A.F.C. managers
Bangor City F.C. managers
Caernarfon Town F.C. managers
English Football League managers
Northern Premier League managers